Ascaris is a genus of parasitic nematode worms known as the "small intestinal roundworms", which is a type of parasitic worm. One species, Ascaris lumbricoides, affects humans and causes the disease ascariasis. Another species, Ascaris suum, typically infects pigs. Parascaris equorum, the equine roundworm, is also commonly called an "ascarid".

Their eggs are deposited in feces and soil. Plants with the eggs on them infect any organism that consumes them. A. lumbricoides is the largest intestinal roundworm and is the most common helminth infection of humans worldwide.  Infestation can cause morbidity by compromising nutritional status, affecting cognitive processes, inducing tissue reactions such as granuloma to larval stages, and by causing intestinal obstruction, which can be fatal.

Morphology
 Adult: cylindrical shape, creamy white or pinkish in color
 Male: average 15–30 cm (6–12 inches); more slender than the female
 Female: average 20–35 cm (8–14 inches)

The body is long, cylindrical, and fusiform (pointed at both the ends). The body wall is composed of cuticle, epidermis and musculature.  There is a pseudocoelom.  Respiration is by simple diffusion. The nervous system consists of a nerve ring and many longitudinal nerve cords.  Reproduction is exclusively sexual, and males are usually shorter than females.

Defense mechanism
As part of the parasite defense strategy, Ascaris roundworms secrete a series of inhibitors to target digestive and immune-related host proteases, which include pepsin, trypsin, chymotrypsin/elastase, cathepsins, and metallocarboxypeptidases (MCPs).
Ascaris species inhibit MCPs by releasing an enzyme known as Ascaris carboxypeptidase inhibitor (ACI).  This enzyme binds to the active site of MCP and blocks the cleavage of its own proteins by the host MCP. Similarly, they inhibit trypsin by releasing the protein Ascaris Trypsin Inhibitor (pdb 1ATA).

History
Ascaris has been present in humans for at least several thousand years, as evidenced by Ascaris eggs found in paleofeces and in the intestines of mummified humans.

A. lumbricoides was originally called Lumbricus teres and was first described in detail by Edward Tyson in 1683. The genus Ascaris was originally described as the genus for Ascaris lumbricoides by Carl Linnaeus in 1758. The morphologically similar Ascaris suum was described from pigs by Johann August Ephraim Goeze in 1782.

Gallery

See also 
 List of parasites (human)

References 

Ascaridida
Nematode genera
Taxa named by Carl Linnaeus